Scirpophaga melanoclista is a moth in the family Crambidae. It was described by Edward Meyrick in 1935. It is found in Angola, the Democratic Republic of the Congo, Ghana, Madagascar, Senegal, Sierra Leone and Zambia.

References

Moths described in 1935
Schoenobiinae
Moths of Africa